The 1948–49 season was the 65th Scottish football season in which Dumbarton competed at national level, entering the Scottish Football League, the Scottish Cup, the Scottish League Cup and the Supplementary Cup.  In addition Dumbarton competed in the Stirlingshire Cup.

Scottish Football League

By mid November, Dumbarton were challenging the leaders of the B Division, but a disastrous spell, which saw only one victory from 17 games, meant that hopes faded and Dumbarton eventually finished 15th out of 16 with 22 points - 20 behind champions Raith Rovers.

Supplementary Cup
Dumbarton's interest in the B Division Supplementary Cup was short lived with a first round exit to Cowdenbeath.

League Cup

Progress from their League Cup section was again to prove too much of a challenge for Dumbarton, finishing 4th and last, with just a draw being taken from their 6 games.

Scottish Cup

Dumbarton brought some cheer to their fans with some success in the Scottish Cup before losing out in the third round to A Division opponents Hearts.

Stirlingshire Cup
Dumbarton won a thrilling first round tie against A Division Falkirk in the 'county' cup but due to other teams' commitments the competition was never completed.

Player statistics

|}

Source:

Transfers

Players in

Players out 

Source:

Reserve team
Dumbarton played only one competitive 'reserve' fixture by entering the Scottish Second XI Cup where they lost in the first round to Partick Thistle.

References

Dumbarton F.C. seasons
Scottish football clubs 1948–49 season